The 2016 Utah general elections were held in the U.S. state of Utah on November 8, 2016. Utah's Governor and Lieutenant Governor, Attorney General, Auditor, and Treasurer were elected, as well as one of Utah's U.S. Senate seats and all four seats in the United States House of Representatives, fifteen Utah Senate seats and all of the Utah House of Representatives seats. Primary elections were held on June 28, 2016.

Federal offices

U.S. Senate

Incumbent Republican Senator Mike Lee was re-elected to a second term.

Misty Snow won the Democratic nomination, and the first transgender woman in the history of the United States to become a major party's nominee for the Senate.

U.S. House of Representatives

All of Utah's four seats in the United States House of Representatives were up for election in November.

State offices

Executive

Governor and Lieutenant Governor

Incumbent Republican Governor Gary Herbert was re-elected to a third term in office. Spencer Cox was Herbert's running mate.

Michael Weinholtz, former Chairman and CEO of CHG Healthcare Services, ran as a Democrat. Kim Bowman, division manager at University of Utah Health Sciences, is Weinholtz's running mate.

Administrative

Attorney General

Candidates
 Sean Reyes, incumbent (R)
 Jon Harper, private practice lawyer (D)
 Andrew McCullough, private practice lawyer (L)
 Michael Isbell, private practice lawyer (IAP)

Auditor

Candidates
 John Dougall, incumbent (R)
 Mike Mitchell, accountant (D)
 Jared Green, FedEx employee (IAP)

Treasurer

Candidates
 David Damschen, incumbent (R)
 Neil Hansen, former state representative (D)
 Richard Proctor, retired economist (C)

Legislative

Utah State Senate

Fifteen Utah State Senate seats were filled in 2016.

Utah House of Representatives
All 75 seats in the Utah House of Representatives were filled in 2016.

References

 
Utah